Chhatrapati Sambhaji Bhosale was the eldest son of Chhatrapati Shivaji and the second ruler of the Maratha kingdom.

Chhatrapati Sambhaji may also refer to: छत्रपती शंभूराजे

People 
 Sambhaji Bhide, Indian Hindu activist
 Sambhaji Raje (born 1971), Indian politician
 Sambhaji Pathare (born 1961), Indian educationist
 Sambhaji Patil Nilangekar (born 1978), Indian politician
 Sambhaji Kadam (born 1932), Indian painter
 Sambhaji II (1698–1760), king of Kolhâpur
 Sambhaji Shahaji Bhosale (1623–1655), brother of Shivaji
 Sambhaji III (1801–1821), Raja of Kolhapur
 Sambhajirao Kakade (1931–2021), Indian politician
 Sambhajirao Kunjir, Indian politician
 Sambhaji Angre (1920–2008), Indian politician

Organizations 
 Sambhaji Brigade